Samuel Colmenares (Aragua) is a Paralympic athlete from Venezuela competing mainly in category T46 sprint events.

He competed in the 2008 Summer Paralympics in Beijing, China. There he won a bronze medal in the men's 400 metres T46 event and went out in the first round of the men's 800 metres - T46 event

External links 
 

Paralympic athletes of Venezuela
Athletes (track and field) at the 2008 Summer Paralympics
Paralympic bronze medalists for Venezuela
Living people
Year of birth missing (living people)
Medalists at the 2008 Summer Paralympics
Paralympic medalists in athletics (track and field)
Medalists at the 2011 Parapan American Games
Medalists at the 2019 Parapan American Games
Venezuelan male middle-distance runners
People from Aragua
20th-century Venezuelan people
21st-century Venezuelan people